Nahandar (also Romanized as Nehendar and Nohendar) is a village in Kamazan-e Olya Rural District, Zand District, Malayer County, Hamadan Province, Iran. At the 2006 census, its population was 108, in 32 families.

References 

Populated places in Malayer County